Alfred Aufdenblatten (12 November 1897 – 17 June 1975) was a mountaineer, ski guide and cross country skier from Zermatt, Switzerland who competed in military patrol at the first winter Olympics in Chamonix in 1924.

The Swiss team, which consisted of Aufdenblatten, Alfons Julen, Anton Julen and  Denis Vaucher, finished first in the competition.

Aufdenblatten also competed in the cross country 50 km at the Chamonix Olympics.

References

1897 births
1975 deaths
Swiss military patrol (sport) runners
Olympic biathletes of Switzerland
Military patrol competitors at the 1924 Winter Olympics
Cross-country skiers at the 1924 Winter Olympics
Olympic gold medalists for Switzerland
People from Zermatt
Medalists at the 1924 Winter Olympics
Sportspeople from Valais